Bamboo vine is a common name for several plants species in the genus Smilax and may refer to:

Smilax bona-nox
Smilax laurifolia, native to the southeastern United States
Smilax pseudochina